Rarities is a compilation album by the American alternative rock band The Presidents of the United States of America. It was released exclusively in Japan on November 1, 1997.

It includes early and live versions of songs from the band's first two albums, a few rare b-sides, and one brand new track, "Novocaine Hurricane". "Video Killed the Radio Star" is a cover of the song by the Buggles, which is a song the band has performed live at almost every concert they've done. They had previously released a live version of it as a b-side, and they later recorded another studio version for the soundtrack to The Wedding Singer (that version was also included on the compilation album, Pure Frosting). "Ça plane pour moi" is a cover of a French song by Plastic Bertrand.

Track listing
All songs written by Chris Ballew unless otherwise noted.
 "Japan" – 2:33
 "Kitty (Clean Version)" – 3:23
 "Volcano (4 Track Original)" – 3:11
 "Too Much Monkey Business" (Chuck Berry) – 2:11
 "Video Killed the Radio Star (Studio Version)" (Geoffrey Downes, Trevor Horn, Bruce Woolley) – 3:10
 "Lump (4 Track Original)" – 2:40
 "Stranger (4 Track Original)" – 2:41
 "Kick Out the Jams (Live)" (Michael Davis, Robert Derminer, Wayne Kramer, Fred "Sonic" Smith) – 2:41
 "Peaches-Momo No Uta (Live)" – 3:07
 "Twig (Semi Acoustic Version)" – 2:56
 "Tiki God (Live)" – 3:09
 "Ça Plane Pour Moi" (Yvan Lacomblez, Lou De Pryck) – 1:54
 "Novocaine Hurricane" (Ballew, Dave Dederer) – 2:13

Personnel
 Chris Ballew – vocals, basitar
 Dave Dederer – guitbass
 Jason Finn – drums

The Presidents of the United States of America (band) albums
1997 compilation albums
Columbia Records compilation albums